CIOG-FM is a Canadian Christian radio station, broadcasting at 91.3 FM in Charlottetown, Prince Edward Island with a rebroadcaster CIOG-FM-1 at 92.5 FM in Summerside.

Owned by the International Harvesters for Christ Evangelistic Association, the station was licensed in 2008.

On June 16, 2010, CIOG applied to the CRTC to change its frequency for its Summerside transmitter from 91.1 to 92.5 MHz; the frequency change was approved on August 13, 2010.

On October 12, 2011, CIOG applied to the CRTC to increase power from 50 watts to 250 watts on both 91.3 and 92.5; the transmitter site for 91.3 will be relocated under the proposal.

On February 6, 2013, the CRTC approved the application by the station to change the authorized contours of 91.3 by increasing its effective radiated power (ERP) from 50 to 250 watts, and to change the authorized contours of 92.5 by increasing that transmitter's ERP from 50 to 250 watts.

References

External links
 CIOG
 
 

Iog
Iog
Radio stations established in 2008
2008 establishments in Prince Edward Island